Pauni Road railway station serves Pauni city and surrounding villages in Bhandara district in Maharashtra, India.

References

Bhandara district
Railway stations in Bhandara district
Nagpur CR railway division